Stroiești ( is a commune located in Suceava County, Bukovina, northeastern Romania. It is composed of three villages, namely: Stroiești, Vâlcelele, and Zaharești.

Politics and local administration

Communal council 

The commune's current local council has the following political composition, according to the results of the 2020 Romanian local elections:

Natives 

 Ion Grămadă

External links 

 Strojestie in the Geographical Dictionary of the Kingdom of Poland

References 

Communes in Suceava County
Localities in Southern Bukovina
Duchy of Bukovina